The 1898–99 United States Senate elections were held on various dates in various states. As these U.S. Senate elections were prior to the ratification of the Seventeenth Amendment in 1913, senators were chosen by state legislatures. Senators were elected over a wide range of time throughout 1898 and 1899, and a seat may have been filled months late or remained vacant due to legislative deadlock. In these elections, terms were up for the senators in Class 1.

The Republican Party gained eight seats at the expense of the Democrats and several minor third parties. The Democrats saw strong gains in the concurrent 1898 House of Representatives elections. However, this group of Senators were last up for election in 1892, since which a major political realignment had occurred. Many state legislatures in northern states that had been controlled by Democrats during the third party system had flipped in the Republican wave years of 1894 and 1896, resulting in the huge number of seats the party gained in 1898.

The Democrats flipped a Silver Republican held seat in Montana while Republicans flipped a Populist held seat in Nebraska. In North Dakota, Wisconsin, Indiana, West Virginia, Maryland, New York, and New Jersey, Republicans flipped Democratic held seats.

A large number of state legislatures failed to fill their Senators during this election cycle: in Utah, a Silver Republican failed to secure re-election; in Delaware and California, a Democrat did so; in Pennsylvania, a Republican seat was lost.

In Nebraska and Florida, senators were elected shortly after the beginning of the 56th Congress on March 4.

In Oregon, a special election was held to fill a vacant seat.

Results summary 
Senate party division, 56th Congress (1899–1901)

 Majority party: Republican (52)
 Minority party: Democratic (25)
 Other parties: Populist (4); Silver Republican (2); Silver (2)
 Vacant: 5
 Total seats: 90

Change in composition

Before the elections 

After the October 7, 1898 special election in Oregon.

Result of the general elections

Beginning of the next Congress

Race summaries

Elections during the 55th Congress 
In these elections, the winners were seated during 1898 or in 1899 before March 4; ordered by election date.

Races leading to the 56th Congress 
In these regular elections, the winners were elected for the term beginning March 4, 1899; ordered by state.

All of the elections involved the Class 1 seats.

Elections during the 56th Congress 
In these elections, the winners were elected in 1899 after March 4, and seated in the 56th Congress.

In this election, the winner was seated in the 57th Congress, starting March 4, 1901.

Maryland 

Louis E. McComas won election by an unknown margin of votes for the Class 1 seat.

Minnesota

New York 

The election in New York was held January 17, 1899.

Democrat Edward Murphy Jr. had been elected to this seat in 1893, and his term would expire on March 3, 1899. At the State election in November 1898, 27 Republicans and 23 Democrats were elected for a two-year term (1899–1900) in the State Senate; and 88 Republicans and 62 Democrats were elected for the session of 1899 to the Assembly. The 122nd New York State Legislature met from January 4 to April 28, 1899, at Albany, New York.

The Republican caucus met on January 12. State Senator Hobart Krum presided. They nominated Chauncey M. Depew unanimously. Depew had been Secretary of State of New York from 1864 to 1865, and was the frontrunning candidate to succeed Thomas C. Platt at the U.S. Senate special election in 1881 when he withdrew after the 41st ballot. Parallel to his political career, he moved up the ladder in the Vanderbilt Railroad System, being President of the New York Central and Hudson River Railroad from 1885 to 1898, and holding positions in dozens of other railroad companies.

The Democratic caucus met also on January 12. State Senator George W. Plunkitt presided. They re-nominated the incumbent U.S. Senator Edward Murphy Jr. unanimously.

Chauncey M. Depew was the choice of both the Assembly and the State Senate, and was declared elected.

Note: The votes were cast on January 17, but both Houses met in a joint session on January 18 to compare nominations, and declare the result.

Ohio

Ohio (special)

Oregon

Oregon (special)

Rhode Island

South Carolina (special)

Utah 

In mid-August 1898, Alfred W. McCune decided to seek office as a Democrat for the United States Senate. State legislators had already indicated they would not support the incumbent, Frank J. Cannon for reelection.  Cannon, a Republican, had voted against the Dingley Act, which would have raised tariffs on sugar and helped the Utah sugar industry. The Dingley bill was strongly supported by the LDS Church hierarchy, who now opposed his reelection. Other factors were his support for Free Silver; rumors about immoral acts he may have committed while living in Washington, D.C.; and that the Utah legislature was controlled by Democrats. The McCunes were close friends with Heber J. Grant, seventh LDS Church president and an ordained LDS apostle. Although the LDS church had (just weeks before) made a decision to stay out of state politics, McCune asked Grant for the church's assistance in winning office. Grant consulted with Joseph F. Smith (Apostle and sixth LDS president) and John Henry Smith (a member of the Quorum of the Twelve Apostles and the First Presidency of the LDS Church), both of whom supported McCune's senatorial bid. But McCune was not alone in seeking the office.  Former Representative William H. King was also running (and backed by two Apostles), as was James Moyle (a prominent attorney and founder of the Utah Democratic Party who was backed by state legislators) and George Q. Cannon (an Apostle and member of the First Presidency).

At the time, members of the Senate were still elected by their respective state legislatures. The Utah state legislature convened in January 1899. There were 13 Republicans and 50 Democrats in the state legislature. From the beginning, McCune was considered the leading candidate. But the legislature quickly deadlocked over the election. One-hundred and twenty-one ballots were cast, and no winner emerged. McCune was one or two votes shy of winning on several ballots. on February 18, before the 122nd ballot, state representative Albert A. Law (a Republican from Cache County and a Cannon supporter) claimed McCune offered him $1,500 for his vote. McCune strenuously denied the charge, and a seven-member legislative established to investigate the allegation. The committee voted 7-to-2 to absolve McCune of the charge, and this outcome was announced to the legislature on March 6. Balloting resumed, and on March 8, on the 149th ballot, McCune still lacked enough votes to win office (he had only 25 votes). The legislature adjourned without having chosen a senator, and McCune traveled in Europe for several weeks to regain his health (returning in June 1899).

Utah's U.S. Senate seat remained vacant until January 1901.

Vermont

See also 

 1898 United States elections
 1898 United States House of Representatives elections
 55th United States Congress
 56th United States Congress

Notes

References 
 Party Division in the Senate, 1789–Present, via Senate.gov